Matthew "Matt" Granovetter (born 1950) is an American bridge player and writer. Granovetter is from Jersey City, New Jersey, and graduated from Hunter College. He subsequently moved to Netanya, Israel. After spending 1993 to 2005 in Israel,  he returned with his wife Pamela to the US. They now live in Cincinnati.

In  competition, Granovetter and Karen McCallum won the 11th quadrennial World Mixed Pairs Championship in 2006, finishing first in a field of 487.

In  competition at the world level, Granovetter played on second-place teams in the 1974 Mixed Teams and the 2008 Seniors Teams. The latter, third in a quadrennial series played for the Senior International Cup, was a nonmedal event at the inaugural World Mind Sports Games. Granovetter played with Russ Ekeblad on a US team that won its 5-day preliminary round-robin field of 16 teams, with Japan second. After winning three long knockout matches each, over five more days, Japan defeated the US by merely 202 s to 200 in the two-day final. Granovetter–Ekeblad scored very well in the 5-day preliminaries, third-best of about 100 pairs.

In 1981–2 and 1983, Granovetter took part in Grand Slam, two televised matches between teams representing the US and Britain, arranged by the BBC. The 1983 match was featured in a book that described him thusly:He is a composer and lyricist and he plays bridge like an artist. One moment he is suffused with extrovert optimism, the next he is submerged in gloomy introspection, which leads to some unsound overbidding and some extreme conservatism. Very often, to achieve the artistically perfect result, he plays so slowly that the whole table seems frozen in some timeless still-life, but he demonstrated time and again that he was one of the best card players on either side.

He and Pamela co-edit the magazine Bridge Today. He has written a number of books about bridge, most of them collaborations with Pamela, as well as musicals for children and mysteries set in the bridge world. He is the bridge editor of the Jerusalem Post.

The Granovetters have developed a bidding system known as the Granovetter Unified System.

Bridge accomplishments

Wins
 World Mixed Pairs Championship (1) 2006
 North American Bridge Championships (6)
 Silodor Open Pairs (1) 1972 
 Senior Knockout Teams (1) 2008 
 Mitchell Board-a-Match Teams (2) 1975, 1982 
 Chicago Mixed Board-a-Match (1) 1999 
 Spingold (1) 2009

Runners-up
 North American Bridge Championships
 Reisinger (2) 1976, 1977 
Kaplan Blue Ribbon Pairs (1) 2017 
Rockwell Mixed Pairs (1) 2019

Bibliography
All his books have been published as by "Matthew Granovetter".

Bridge
Unless otherwise noted, all the books in this section were co-authored by Pamela Granovetter.
Tops and Bottoms, C & T Bridge Supplies (1987), 
Jenny Mae the Bridge Pro, co-authored with Martin Hoffman, Granovetter Books (1994), 
Bridge Addition 96: New Age Inventions Tempered With Old-Fashioned Advice, Granovetter Books (1995), . (Matthew Granovetter was the sole author.)
Forgive Me, Partner! The Guide to a Successful Partnership, co-authored with Pamela Granovetter and Larry Cohen, Granovetter Books (1997)
Learn to Play Bridge in 9 Minutes, Perigee Trade (2001), 
Best of Bridge Today Digest, edited by Matthew and Pamela Granovetter, Master Point Press (2001), . (Further collections of Bridge Today articles have been published subsequently.)
Bridge Conventions in Depth, Master Point Press (2003), 
A Switch in Time: How to take ALL your tricks on defense, Granovetter Books ( 2012),

The GUS bidding system
Gus - Introducing Gus, CreateSpace Independent Publishing Platform (2012), 
Gus Weak-Two Bids (Volume 2), CreateSpace Independent Publishing Platform (2012), 
Gus One Notrump, CreateSpace Independent Publishing Platform (2013), 
Gus One of a Major - Two Clubs (Gus Bridge Bidding System) (Volume 4), CreateSpace Independent Publishing Platform (2014), 
One of a Major Bidding (GUS) (Volume 5), CreateSpace Independent Publishing Platform (2014), 
GUS One Diamond (Volume 6), CreateSpace Independent Publishing Platform (2014),

Mysteries
Murder at the Bridge Table (Or, How to Improve Your Duplicate Score Overnight), Granovetter Books (1988)
The Bridge Team Murders, Granovetter Books (1992), 
I Shot My Bridge Partner, Master Point Press (1999),

Musicals for children
The Princess and the Pauper: A musical play, Dramatic Pub. Co (1983)
The Treasure Makers, S. French (1984),

References

External links
 
 
  – not all co-written with Matthew
  

1950 births
American contract bridge players
Contract bridge writers
Hunter College alumni
People from Ballston, New York
American emigrants to Israel
Israeli contract bridge players 
Jewish contract bridge players
Living people
Place of birth missing (living people)
Date of birth missing (living people)